The 2008–09 Vanderbilt Commodores women's basketball team represented Vanderbilt University in the 2008–09 NCAA Division I basketball season. The Commodores are a member of the Southeast Conference and competed in the Sweet Sixteen at the NCAA Tournament. It was the Commodores 14th appearance in the NCAA Sweet 16 after earning its sixth Southeastern Conference Tournament championship.

Exhibition

Regular season
February 15: The Commodores wore pink jerseys to commemorate North Carolina State head coach Kay Yow. Christina Wirth scored 21 points to lead five players in double figures as the Commodores defeated Georgia 80-64. The other players in double figures were Merideth Marsh, who had 18 points, while Jennifer Risper, Hannah Tuomi and Tia Gibbs each had 10. Danielle Taylor led Georgia with 20 points in 32 minutes off the bench. Angel Robinson added 17. Vanderbilt  used a 17-3 second-half run to take the lead for good. The score was tied 47-47 when Wirth made a jump shot as Marsh was fouled away from the ball. Marsh made both free throws to complete the four-point sequence and then scored the final five points of the run with a layup and three free throws.

Roster

Schedule

Player stats

Postseason

SEC Tournament
Vanderbilt 69, Georgia 61
Vanderbilt 61, LSU 47
Vanderbilt 61, Auburn 54

March 8: The Commodores earned the SEC Tournament crown for sixth time in school history. In the championship game, Christine Wirth scored 20 points, and the Commodores (No. 23 ESPN/USA Today, No. 22 AP) beat Auburn (No. 5 ESPN/USA Today, No. 6 AP) 61-54 to win the Southeastern Conference tournament.

Vanderbilt (24-8) defeated the Tigers (29-3) for the second time in three weeks to win the SEC tournament. Vanderbilt also extended its winning streak over Auburn to 15. Auburn star DeWanna Bonner was held to nine points after scoring a combined 58 in her first two games of the tournament. Whitney Boddie led the Tigers with 14 points and eight assists.
This was the 10th straight year the No. 1 seed has failed to win the SEC tournament. Wirth was named the tournament's most valuable player while Jennifer Risper also made the all-tournament squad. Vanderbilt has the second-most SEC tournament titles of any program, trailing only Tennessee's 13.

NCAA basketball tournament
Seeding in brackets
Raleigh Regional - Raleigh, NC
Vanderbilt (4) 73, Western Carolina (13) 44
Vanderbilt 74, Kansas State (5) 61
Maryland (1) 78, Vanderbilt 74

Awards and honors
Christina Wirth, All-Senior All-America First Team by the Lowe's Senior CLASS Award committee.
Christina Wirth, All-SEC Honors
Christina Wirth, SEC Tournament Most Valuable Player 
Christina Wirth, SEC All-Tournament Team
Christina Wirth, 2008-09 Vanderbilt women's Co-Athletes of the Year.
Christina Wirth has received honorable mention on the 2009 State Farm Coaches' All-America Team 
Jennifer Risper, SEC All-Tournament Team
Jennifer Risper, 2008-09 Vanderbilt women's Co-Athletes of the Year.
Jennifer Risper, The Women's Basketball Coaches Association (WBCA) has selected Vanderbilt's Jennifer Risper as the WBCA National Defensive Player of the Year.

Team players drafted into the WNBA

See also
2008–09 Vanderbilt Commodores men's basketball team

References

External links
Official Site

Vanderbilt Commodores women's basketball seasons
Vanderbilt
Vanderbilt